Canada Di Flight (English: Flight To Canada) is a  Punjabi-language film directed by Roopesh Rai Sikand, written by Manoj Sabharwal and starring Yuvraj Hans, Navraj Hans, Tarun Mehta, Shobhita Rana, Akriti Bharati, Aanushka Ramesh as the main cast. It was released worldwide on 1 April 2016.

Plot
Three close childhood friends, Jigar, Harry and Laddi, living in a village in Punjab decide to immigrate to Canada for a better life and in search of their "dollar dreams." Jigar is a spoiled child of rich parents; Harry is a show-off and bragger; and Laddi aka Phattu is nebbish and clumsy. As they're hanging out in the village, they look upwards in the sky and point to a distant plane saying, "Look... The flight to Canada!" However, their parents are not supportive of their pursuit to settle abroad. The three come across a travel agent, Chawla, who ensures them each a visa and flight to Canada for Rs 1.5 million. They are aware that they won't get this kind of financial support from their parents.

They encounter Minto and Shurli, two men originally from their village and whom the three friends have known since childhood, who are now apparently settled in Canada. Minto alleges that he has worked hard in Canada to become a successful businessman today and invites the entire village for a party later that night. The three friends now get fully charged up for going to Canada. They somehow manage to accumulate the money and give it to Chawla. However, Chawla informs that they need to take a layover in Bangkok for three days and then catch the onward flight to Canada. The three bid farewell to their families and board the plane.

Upon their arrival in Bangkok, they check into a hotel arranged by Chawla. They learn that the hotel is owned by a rich Punjabi businessman, Kabir Gill. They notice two girls by the swimming pool of the hotel, and they mistake them for Kabir's sisters. The three get a little anxious as it has been two days and they haven't heard from Chawla. Chawla falsely assures them they will get the tickets the next day; and then he breaks his SIM card and shuts his shop for good. On completion of their three days of their stay, the hotel throws them out as Chawla has not made the payment. As the three friends are now getting frustrated on the streets of Bangkok, a Punjabi garage owner offers them assistance with employment, food and housing. The three now realize that they've become victims of a scam by Chawla.

One day, Jigar and Harry capitalize on their visit to Kabir's house for delivering his car from their garage. They intend on getting into a relationship with Kabir's "sisters" so that they can get a share of his enormous property and business. They introduce themselves as rich diamond merchants and begin relationships, Jigar with Roop and Harry with Gurnoor. Laddi meets a Punjabi girl named Sona at a club and the two hook up.

When the three friends are going around on the streets of Bangkok, they spot Minto and Shurli, the two guys from their village who claimed to be living in Canada. The three figure out that Minto is actually a pimp and Shurli is his associate. They threaten the two that they will disclose their reality, start blackmailing Minto, and quit their garage job. Getting despondent with their demands, Minto and Shurli decide to get the three killed and hire a contract killer, Babbu Don. Shurli informs Laddi about the proposed assassination and demands 7,000 Bath for giving that information. The trio approaches the garage owner for help.

In the meantime, Jigar and Harry propose to their girlfriends and they say yes. Laddi tells the entire series of events to Sona, how the three of them ended up in Bangkok. Jigar and Harry join them and Laddi informs his friends that Sona is, in fact, the garage owner's sister. Roop and Gurnoor follow. The garage owner arrives and Roop and Gurnoor learn that Jigar and Harry work at the garage and are not diamond merchants. Kabir's wife also scolds Roop and Gurnoor that they should be home mopping the floor. Jigar and Harry realize that the girls are not Kabir's sisters but work in houses as maids. The three friends call their mothers and confides that they're stuck in Bangkok and the entire money they spent to immigrate to Canada has been mislaid. The mothers advise their sons to return to Punjab. Jigar and Harry reunite with Roop and Gurnoor.

The three men, their girlfriends and garage owner hatch a plan to get rid of the contract killer by kidnapping Kabir's wife. Confusion prevails in the entire kidnapping. Babu Don, Kabir, Minto and Shurli are overpowered as a result and the garage owner suggests that those people should be sent to "no man's land" from where they won't be able to come back.

The film ends in Punjab where the trio are now married to the girls. As their wives get them lunch in the fields, their sons look upwards in the sky and point to a distant plane saying, "Look... The flight to Canada!" but they're chided by their fathers for doing that.

Cast 
 Yuvraj Hans as Jigar
 Navraj Hans as Harry
 Tarun Mehta as Laadi
 Rana Ranbir as Babbu Don
 Nirmal Rishi as Mother-in-law
 Akriti Bharti as Gurnoor
 Shobhita Rana as Roop
 Aanushka Ramesh as Sona
 Ramesh Kumar Minto as Minto
 Sanjeev Atri as Shurly
 Rajinder Gill (Shakku Rana) as Kabir Gill
 Ajay Verma as Lovely Pistol
 Rajvinder Kaur as Don's wife
 Vrushali Hatalkar as Mrs. Kabir Gill
 Manoj Sabharwal as Jalebi Waala
 Anand Singh as College Professor 
 Gurpal Singh as Bittoo Garage Man
 Santosh Malhotra as Laadi's mother
 Rajinder Rozy as Harry's mother
 Satwant Kaur as Jigar's mother
 Sanjay Makkar as Jigar's father
 Lali Gill as Harry's father
 Lakha Lahiri as Chawla Travel Agent
 Amrit Pal as Sonu Pahalwan

Soundtrack

References

2016 films
Punjabi-language Indian films
2010s Punjabi-language films
Films set in Punjab, India
Films set in Bangkok
Films about immigration in Canada
Films scored by Gurmeet Singh
Films scored by Jassi Katyal
Films scored by Altaaf Sayyed